Marvel Puzzle Quest is a video game released by D3 Publisher and Marvel Entertainment on October 3, 2013, and developed by Demiurge Studios. The fourth installment in the Puzzle Quest series, it is a free-to-play, match-three Bejeweled-style puzzle battle game set in the Marvel universe, featuring 290 playable, unlockable, recruitable Marvel characters.

It is available for free on the App Store for iOS, Google Play for Android and Steam for Microsoft Windows. A high-definition port of the game developed by WayForward Technologies was released on PlayStation 3, PlayStation 4, and Xbox 360 in 2015; and Xbox One in 2016. The game was released on Amazon Kindle in 2016.

Gameplay
Players assemble a team of three Marvel superheroes or supervillains from various storylines, controlling the team against a team of up to three other superheroes or supervillains in match-three, turn-based battles. Each color-coded match does damage to the player's opponent, while creating action points which can obtain special skills. Gems disappear and are replenished from above as they are matched. When they are matched, the six colors of gems on the board grant energy that can be used to execute special moves. Players trade hits back and forth until one of them is downed. When all enemies are downed the fight is over revealing a reward for the winner: one of the in-game currencies, special boosts or a new character. This character can be added to your roster. If it's a duplicate, it becomes a level-up cover. Players earn points by winning battles, and then apply the points to unlock new attacks and level up. The board is highly tactical, with up to half a dozen potential considerations beyond the best match at any given point.

There are two main modes: story and multiplayer, where the players can fight against other teams controlled by the game's artificial intelligence. The game is free, with opportunities to purchase level-ups or new characters. New characters, a bundle of Iso-8, hero coins and other items can also be obtained by replaying old levels. As a player's roster expands, the possibilities for team composition and skill selection also expand.

A player collects in-game comic book covers to unlock new characters and improve existing ones. Each character has a set of real comic book covers associated with them, which represent the character's abilities and allow the player to improve the character's abilities or level them up. In July 2014, Team-Ups were introduced, allowing a player to battle with single-use abilities from characters that aren't part of the player's teams.
Characters are ranked in different tiers using stars. They range from one star characters which are the weakest to five star characters which are the strongest and most powerful.

Synopsis
The story involves a powerful new substance called Iso-8 and Norman Osborn's attempts to supplant S.H.I.E.L.D. There are five missions to stop Osborn on his worldwide terror spree. The original story is based on the Dark Reign storyline and was written by Frank Tieri and Alex Irvine. Irvine also wrote other player versus environment events of the game, such as “Webbed Wonder,” where  Spider-Man teams up with Howard the Duck to find out Aunt May's whereabouts.

Characters
The game features an array of classic Marvel heroes and villains, including Spider-Man, Captain America, Wolverine, Iron Man, Thor, Black Widow, Storm and Magneto, along with lesser-known characters like Moonstone. In commemoration of the game's first anniversary, Thor: Goddess of Thunder, the female version of Thor, was added on October 17, 2014, making Marvel Puzzle Quest the first video game to feature the character. Devil Dinosaur was also added as a playable character for the anniversary, via an anniversary pack and as a daily reward for those who had been playing for over 365 days. Other characters that have been added since the game's inception include Blade in October 2014 and Cyclops in February 2015. Kamala Khan, who was announced as a new Marvel character in November 2013 and is the first Muslim superhero to lead a comic book series, was featured in the game. The game has steadily received two new characters per month. As of March 2023, there are 290 characters in the game including 8 one-star, 14 two-star, 52 three-star, 136 four-star and 80 five-star characters.

Three variants of existing characters were created specially for the game: a Peggy Carter who became Captain America, and eventually got both a comics version as part of the Exiles, and an animated version in the show What If...?; Wolverine (Samurai Daken), where Wolverine's son takes on his father's codename as an atonement for killing him; and Deadpool (Spirit of Vengeance), a Deadpool that became a Ghost Rider.

History and development
The first Puzzle Quest game, Puzzle Quest: Challenge of the Warlords, was conceived and designed by Australian game designer Steve Fawkner, the original designer of the Warlords computer game series, which he created in 1989. In creating Puzzle Quest, Fawkner was inspired by his love of the tile-matching puzzle video game Bejeweled. Puzzle Quest: Challenge of the Warlords was picked up by D3 Publisher and released on March 20, 2007, for the Nintendo DS and PlayStation Portable. It was an instant success, winning a 2008 Academy of Interactive Arts & Sciences award for Downloadable Game of the Year. It was also nominated for Handheld Game of the Year. Versions for Xbox Live Arcade, Wii, Windows, PlayStation 2 and mobile followed later that year. It was released for PlayStation 3 and iOS in late 2008.

Marvel Puzzle Quest was launched worldwide by D3 Publisher and Marvel Entertainment on October 3, 2013. It was the second game developed internally by Demiurge Studios. The game was originally titled Marvel Puzzle Quest: Dark Reign, before the subtitle "Dark Reign" was dropped following a July 2014 update. D3 Publisher stated that the revised title signified the beginning of the game's expansion beyond the "Dark Reign" storyline.

On February 18, 2015, Sega Networks acquired Demiurge Studios, but the acquisition did not include the rights to Marvel Puzzle Quest.

In 2022, 505 Games purchased D3 Go!, and upkeep of Marvel Puzzle Quest was eventually passed over to Broken Circle Studios.

Critical reception
IGN rated the game a 9.1 out of 10, writing, "Marvel Puzzle Quest has taken the idea of a puzzle game with a strategic/role-playing element overlay, and turned it into an intricately crafted, remarkably deep experience". IGN added that the game is "compelling at each level" with "constant challenges and goals to work toward". Touch Arcade awarded it four out of five stars, calling it "compulsively, sickeningly playable" and writing that, in comparison to other Puzzle Quest games, Marvel Puzzle Quest is more calculated and strategic, with a focus on team fighting rather than individual combat. The game has received a rating of 74 on Metacritic. MacLife said it "does a good job of spicing up the match-three genre for comic fans".

Marvel Puzzle Quest is a 2014 Tabby Award Best Android Apps and Games winner in the Game: Puzzle, Cards & Family category.

Peter Rubin, Contributing Editor at Wired Magazine, wrote a feature length article about the game 7 years after release, Marvel Puzzle Quest Might Just Be My Forever Game

See also
 List of video games based on Marvel Comics
 Puzzle Quest: Challenge of the Warlords
 Puzzle Quest: Galactrix
 Puzzle Quest 2

References

External links
 

2013 video games
D3 Publisher games
Science fantasy video games
IOS games
Android (operating system) games
Windows games
Mobile games
Role-playing video games
Video games developed in the United States
Multiplayer and single-player video games
Video games based on Marvel Comics
Video games scored by Rod Abernethy
Tile-matching video games
PlayStation 3 games
PlayStation 4 games
PlayStation Network games
Xbox 360 Live Arcade games
Xbox One games
Puzzle Quest
WayForward games
Demiurge Studios games